John D. Cavaletto (born June 8, 1940) was a Republican member of the Illinois House of Representatives, representing the 107th District since his election in 2008. On September 18, 2017, Cavaletto announced he would not be seeking reelection in 2018. He was succeeded by Republican Blaine Wilhour.

Biography
Born June 8, 1940 in Centenary, Indiana, John Cavaletto graduated from Sesser High School and then went on to earn his bachelor's and master's degrees in Education at Southern Illinois University at Carbondale. He received his Administrative Endorsement from Eastern Illinois University.

At 14, he and his future wife, Connie, obtained their social security cards together so they could go to work at the summer camp for disabled children at Giant City State Park in Carbondale. After many years of developing programs for special needs people, his summer programs became the model for the Kennedy Foundation and its program that would become the Special Olympics movement.

John became a teacher and basketball coach—taking the Breese Mater Dei High School basketball team to the Illinois State Championships and leading that team to 4th Place in the very competitive big schools division of Illinois in 1974. Still referred to as "Coach" by many colleagues, friends, and former students, he became the principal of Salem Community High School and retired from there in 2001.

The grandson of immigrant coal miners in the Sesser area, John Cavaletto is a southern Illinois boy through-and-through. He and his wife, Connie, have three sons and three grandchildren. He is an avid quail hunter, fisherman, and loves golf.

Representative Cavaletto served on the Appropriations – Public Safety Committee, Counties and Townships Committee, Elementary & Secondary Education: School Curriculum & Policies Committee, Transportation, Regulation Roads & Bridges Committee and serves as the Minority Spokesperson for both the newly created Special Needs Services Committee and the Small Business Empowerment & Workforce Development Committee. He has also served on the Agriculture & Conservation Committee and the Cities & Villages Committee.

The recipient of the "Legislator of the Year" Award from the Illinois Association of Fire Protection Districts, Mr. Cavaletto has also been awarded the Illinois Farm Bureau's ACTIVATOR Award as a "Friend of Agriculture" each legislative session of his service.

References

External links
Representative John Cavaletto (R) 107th District at the Illinois General Assembly
By session: 98th, 97th, 96th
 

Republican Party members of the Illinois House of Representatives
Living people
1978 births
21st-century American politicians